Aakhri Station is a 1965 Pakistani Urdu film based on short story Pagli by feminist Urdu literature writer Hajra Masroor while screenplay is written by Suroor Barabankvi. Directed and produced by Barabankvi also, the film stars Haroon and Rani in lead roles along with Shabnam in supporting role.

Aakhri Station is a prime example of film making of East Pakistan: literary and socially conscious. The story of the film revolves around the romance of Fozia, station master's daughter and Jameel, an honest engineer surrounded by corrupt contractors. Shabnam's performance in the film was praised and is regarded as one of her career's best. The film was included in the list of 10 Best Films of Pakistani cinema by BBC Urdu.

Plot
Jamil, a young engineer comes to East Pakistan where he joins the railway department. On station, there is a mentally retarded girl who often wanders there. It comes across to Jamil that there is a backstory behind her mental retardation. Some time before, her marriage was called off because her father could not fulfill the groom's demand of huge dowry. Her father died in result and she became unconscious/mad.

Cast 
 Rani
 Haroon
 Shabnam
 Shaukat Akbar
 Jalil Afghani
 Mushtaq
 Aziz
 Sattar

Awards and nominations

References

External links 
 

1965 films
Pakistani black-and-white films
Urdu-language Bangladeshi films
1960s Urdu-language films
Films based on short fiction
Films scored by Khan Ataur Rahman
Pakistani drama films
Urdu-language Pakistani films